Ophelimity is an economic concept introduced by Vilfredo Pareto as a measure of purely economic satisfaction, so he could use the already well-established term utility as a measure of a more broadly based satisfaction encompassing other dimensions as well, such as the ethical, moral, religious, and political. As such, it corresponds to the sense in which utility is often used in economic calculations. Irving Fisher proposed replacing ophelimity (and thus utility as it is commonly construed) with the term wantability.

See also
Autotelic, another term for whether a thing has useful contingency (purpose through specific utility) or is an ends with purpose unto itself.
Social preferences

References

Further reading 
.

Utility
Vilfredo Pareto